Summer Days is a Japanese video game released in 2006.

Summer Days may also refer to: 

 "Summer Days", a 1975 hit for Lou Christie
 "Summer Days", a 2001 song by Bob Dylan from Love and Theft
 "Summer Days", song by Milow featuring Sebastián Yatra
 "Summer Days", non-album single by Arizona
 "Summer Days" (Martin Garrix song), 2019
 Summer Days (And Summer Nights!!), album by the Beach Boys
 Summer Days (film), 1990 German film

See also
 Summer (disambiguation)
 Winter Days